MAX dimerization protein 3 is a protein that in humans is encoded by the MXD3 gene located on Chromosome 5.

MXD3 is a basic helix-loop-helix protein belonging to a subfamily of MAX-interacting proteins. This protein competes with MYC for binding to MAX to form a sequence-specific DNA-binding complex. MXD3 is a transcriptional repressor that is specifically expressed during S phase of the cell cycle. The protein is implicated in both normal neural development and in the development of brain cancer. In medulloblastoma cells, MXD3 binds E-box sequences, leading to increased cell proliferation at moderate MXD3 levels but increased cell death and apoptosis at higher expression levels.

References

Transcription factors